Sunnhordland is a traditional district in the western region of Norway.  The district consists of the southern coastal regions of the old Hordaland county (now part of Vestland county). It includes the areas that surround the mouth of the Hardangerfjorden and the surrounding islands.  The municipalities of Sveio, Etne, Stord, Bømlo, Fitjar, Kvinnherad, and Tysnes (and sometimes Austevoll) make up the district of Sunnhordaland.  The regional centre of this district is the town of Leirvik in Stord.  

About 50% of the land area is mountainous land above  in elevation with most of the population living below that level in the valleys and coastal areas.

Name
The name Sunnhordland is derived from "søndre Hordaland" which means "the southern part of Hordaland".  It is similar in nature to the nearby districts of Nordhordland and Midhordland. 

People from Sunnhordland are called Sunnhordlendinger and the people in this area speak a Norwegian dialect called Sunnhordlandsmål.

References

Districts of Vestland
Sveio
Etne
Stord
Bømlo
Fitjar
Kvinnherad
Tysnes